Sir Jules Thorn (7 February 1899 – 12 December 1980) was the founder of Thorn Electrical Industries, one of the United Kingdom's largest electrical businesses.

Career
Born in Vienna to Jewish parents Leibisch Thorn and Teme Thorn (née Finkelstein), Julius (later known as Jules) Thorn was conscripted into the Austrian Army during World War I. After the War he studied at the Handelshochschule (Business School) in Vienna.

In 1923 Thorn moved to the United Kingdom as representative for Olso, an Austrian manufacturer of gas mantles. In 1926 Olso went bankrupt and Thorn chose to set up business on his own trading as the Electric Lamp Service Company. In 1936 he diversified into manufacturing and expanded the company into one of the largest electrical businesses in the country, Thorn Electrical Industries. He was knighted in 1964.

In 1970 Thorn retired from full-time involvement in the business to devote himself to his racehorses and his collection of Impressionist paintings. He was a successful racehorse owner and won the 2,000 Guineas Stakes at Newmarket with High Top in 1972. Only in 1976 did he retire as Chairman of the business. Sir Jules was a noted philanthropist supporting many medical, educational, artistic and humanitarian charities and endeavours. A large number of legal and medical scholarships as well as museums carry his name.

Thorn died in Westminster on 12 December 1980, not long after seeing his company's successful takeover of its long-time rival EMI. His work and vision is continued through the Sir Jules Thorn Charitable Trust, chaired until recently by his daughter Ann Rylands.

Family
In 1928 he married Dorothy Olive Tanner and together they went on to have one son and one daughter. He married a second time, to Jean Norfolk, in 1971.

References

1899 births
1980 deaths
20th-century British businesspeople
British Jews
British racehorse owners and breeders
Knights Bachelor
Austrian emigrants to the United Kingdom
Austro-Hungarian military personnel of World War I
Naturalised citizens of the United Kingdom
20th-century British philanthropists